LaGrange Lock and Dam is a lock and dam complex on the Illinois River at Versailles, Illinois. The structure includes a  dam and a  lock. The U.S. Army Corps of Engineers built the complex from 1936 to 1939; A.F. Griffin designed the lock and dam, while Paul Le Gromwell designed the control station. The lock and dam, as well as a similar lock and dam near Peoria, were needed when the authorized channel depth was raised to nine foot.  The Peoria and LaGrange locks replaced older locks on the lower Illinois River. The lock uses Chanoine wicket gates, which allow for navigation on the river, rather than the Tainter gates seen elsewhere on the river.

The structure was added to the National Register of Historic Places on March 10, 2004.

References

Dams on the National Register of Historic Places in Illinois
Buildings and structures completed in 1939
Buildings and structures in Brown County, Illinois
Locks on the National Register of Historic Places in Illinois
Historic districts on the National Register of Historic Places in Illinois
National Register of Historic Places in Brown County, Illinois
Transportation in Brown County, Illinois